NVX may refer to:

 N-version execution environment (NVX) used for N-version programming
 Yamaha NVX, several motorscooters in the Yamaha Aerox lineup
 Novavax, a pharmaceutical company which uses the product code "NVX-"
 Invoxia, an electronics company which uses the model code "NVX"

See also

 1NVX, a protein configuration for HRAS